Dysidinae is a subfamily of beetles.

References

Bibliography

External links
Dysidinae at ITIS

Bostrichidae